opened in Takikawa, Hokkaidō, Japan in 1977.

See also
 List of Cultural Properties of Japan - historical materials (Hokkaidō)
 Takikawa Museum of Art and Natural History

References

External links
  Takikawa Local History Museum

Takikawa, Hokkaido
Museums in Hokkaido
Museums established in 1977
1977 establishments in Japan
History museums in Japan